Against the Dying of the Light is a 2001 documentary film about the work of the National Screen and Sound Archive of Wales.

Film history
Consisting of interviews with Welsh directors, actors and public figures about the significance that film (particularly amateur film) has played in their lives, it achieved a limited UK cinema release in 2001.

The film was also shown at a handful of festivals and special screenings around the world, including two at the British Academy of Film and Television Arts in London.  An intriguing gem, it is still occasionally to be seen at cinemas and film societies in the UK.

The film was directed by Jack Jewers, produced by Jack Jewers, Leo Brend and the (then) head of the archive, Iola Baines.  It features interviews with William Lloyd-George, (grandson of David Lloyd George); the actors Rhys Ifans, Donna Edwards and Sue Rodderick; the directors Marc Evans and Karl Francis; and the author Kevin Brownlow.

Jewers described the commissioning of the film as follows:

Jewers recorded that he was struck by "the sheer power and historical value" of the Welsh Film Archive, and "astonished to discover" 8mm film of Hitler meeting David Lloyd George.

Jewers described his approach to the film as:

Title

The title of the film comes from a villanelle written for his dying father by the twentieth century Welsh poet Dylan Thomas, Do Not Go Gentle Into That Good Night.

References

External links
 
 

2001 films
British documentary films
Welsh-language films
Documentary films about the film industry
2001 documentary films
Documentary films about Wales
2000s English-language films
2000s British films